Pop Punk Zombies is a 2011 American horror film directed by Steve Dayton and written by Brian Leis.  Adam Hatfield stars as a greedy manager who brings back a punk band as zombies.

Plot 
When the members of a punk band die, Dameon David, a greedy manager, brings them back to life again as zombies.  David attempts to civilize the zombies as he manipulates them for his own benefit.

Cast 
 Ian Kane as Eddy Whitset
 Nick Marinnuci as Ciezmore Jones
 Laura Savage as Lisa Corteen
 Adam Hatfield as Dameon David

Production 
Pop Punk Zombies was shot at The Warehouse, a local Wisconsin nightclub, in 2008 and 2009.  The Disabled were recruited for the main theme.

Release 
The film was released direct-to-video by Brain Damage Films in 2011.

Reception 
Mark L. Miller of AICN said that the film "had a great idea" but the crew "lacked the skill or talent available to pull it off."  HorrorSociety.com called the storyline "flawed and illogical" but said that the film had a fun concept.

References

External links 
 

2011 films
2011 horror films
American independent films
American zombie films
Films shot in Wisconsin
Direct-to-video horror films
2010s English-language films
2010s American films